Andrey Yuryevich Yudin (born 11 June 1967) is a former Russian futsal player and current head coach of Dina Moscow. He was also a part of the CIS futsal team.

Biography
Yudin is a graduate of the “Medik” sports academy. He started his futsal career in “Moslift”, where he spent two years. He joined Dina Moscow in 1991. After eight successful seasons in Dina he became eight-time champion of Russian Super League. He won Russian Futsal Cup for six times, European Clubs Championship for three times and Intercontinental Cup. Unlike the majority of his teammates, he played only two games for the CIS futsal team. In 1999 Yudin became the Dina Moscow reserve team playing coach. Then he moved to Azerbaijan Premier League. As a part of “Turan Air” he became Azerbaijan League champion and took part in UEFA Futsal Cup. Andrey coached Arbat Moscow for three years and then returned to Dina Moscow. In the 2007/2008 season he coached the Azerbaijan national team.

Honours
Russian Futsal Super League Winner (7): 1992/93, 1993/94, 1994/95, 1995/96, 1996/97, 1997/98, 1998/99
Russian Futsal Cup Winner (6): 1992, 1993, 1995, 1996, 1997, 1998
European Clubs Championship Winner (3): 1995, 1997, 1999
Intercontinental Cup (1): 1997
Russian Super League Cup (1): 1995
Azerbaijan Premier League Winner (1): 2001/02

External links
MFK Dina Moskva profile
AMFR profile

1967 births
Living people
MFK Dina Moskva players
Russian men's futsal players